The American Century: Varieties of Culture in Modern Times is a 1997 book by Norman F. Cantor with Mindy Cantor. In this book Norman Cantor, who is best known for his treatment of medieval European history, traces 20th-century Western intellectual thought, including art, literature, philosophy, psychology, criticism, and other intellectual disciplines. As the title implies, Cantor devotes the most space to describing the intellectual trends in the United States, but only to the degree that he believes the United States has dominated 20th-century Western culture. Cantor also describes the writings and accomplishments of intellectuals from other Western countries, particularly France, Germany, and the United Kingdom.

The book is divided into several broad headings, including Modernism, Psychoanalysis, and Postmodernism. In chapters entitled "Marxism and the Left" and "Traditions on the Right", Cantor describes, often critically, aspects of both left-wing and right-wing intellectual trends and institutions.

Mindy Cantor, an art historian, prepared the photo essays which provide a glimpse of representative styles of 20th-century art and architecture.

The book is written in an informal style and Cantor offers his own idiosyncratic interpretation of major intellectual events of the 20th century.

1997 non-fiction books
HarperCollins books